Baloji or Balójí refers to the Balochi language

It may also refer to:

Baloji (rapper), Belgian rapper of Congolese origin
Baloji Kunjar or Balaji Kunjar (17**–1816), Maratha Sardar and Minister of Affairs in service of Peshwa Baji Rao II